Liboi is a town in Garissa County, Kenya, at the border with Somalia.

Location
The coordinates of Liboi are: 00°21'20.0"N,  40°52'32.0"E.

Overview

Liboi is an administrative location in Liboi division, one of eleven administrative divisions of the Garissa County. Liboi location has a total population of 11,440, as of 2009. Electorally Liboi is a ward and part of Dadaab Constituency. Liboi Airport, which lies within the town, serves Liboi and neighboring communities.

History 
On 6 September 1940, Liboi was the site of fighting during World War II between Allied forces under British command and Italian colonial forces; the battle was an Italian victory. This was the first engagement of the war involving South African troops.

In the early 1990s, at the beginning of the Somali Civil War, Liboi was the site of a major refugee camp; in 1992, 50,000 Somalis were living near Liboi.

References

External links
 Website of Garissa County Government
 Census: Kenya has 38.6 million people - 31 August 2010

Populated places in Garissa County
Refugee camps in Kenya
Kenya–Somalia border crossings